"Ups & Downs"/"Bang Out" is the fourth single of Snoop Dogg's album R&G (Rhythm & Gangsta) The Masterpiece. It is the only single from the album not produced by The Neptunes.

Background
The song interpolates The Bee Gees' 1979 hit "Love You Inside Out". It has a very different sound with a slower Beats per minute rate that are more characteristic of Snoop Dogg and of the album as a whole. Upon release, the single received some criticism Rolling Stone | Music News, Reviews, Photos, Videos, Interviews and More due to re-using the sample which had been used only 2 years earlier by Jay-Z and R. Kelly in "Honey" from their Best of Both Worlds project. Although the vocal is credited to Shon Don with the Bee Gees it wasn't recorded with the performers together and like so it can be considered as a tribute in honour of the original artists instead. Because the track contains a sample with an early British sound it became popular in Europe in the first place. In some prints of the cover of the R&G album the introductory sentence of "Ups & Downs" "Every Dogg Has His Day" is indicated as a separate interlude that sample from the motion picture "Scarface". However, with or without it the length of the track remains four minutes seven seconds long.

It was performed by Snoop Dogg at the Live 8 concert in London on July 2, 2005.

Music video 
The premiere of video for the single was first aired on Friday, April 29 at 7:30 p.m. on BET. It was directed by Anthony Mandler and consists of three parts where each section ends with a fade out. The first half was shot entirely in black and white to give the watcher a 1970s flashback feeling.

In the intro Nuthin' but a "G" Thang is played as background music. The beginning portrays us a suburban modern residence, where Snoop is ensconced and spies out across the window blind when sirens and tire screech can be heard followed by the "Every Dogg Has His Day" insert. Then he settles into his armchair with Mr. Cartoon sitting next to him, who continues to tattoo a real R&G logo on Snoop's right shoulder. Mr. Cartoon is the professional tattoo artist member of the creative team, the Soul Assassins, whose production company made the video, and he designed the R&G initials himself for the album cover artwork.

Ups & Downs starts, while Snoop visits his girls hanging around in the house, while the rest of his mob is lifting dumbbells and playing domino in the trashy garden. Cameo appearances done by The Game, his Black Wall Street affiliates and the Soul Assassins. In the lyrics Snoop claims that despite of all rumours he still trusts imprisoned Tray Deee and has no feud going on between them, but the Eastsidaz no longer exist.
Snoop and some of his crew can be seen wearing a "Western Conference" pullover (See Trivia).

The outro is for "Bang Out", a song mixed and produced by Jonathan "J.R." Rotem (can be known from Lil' Kim's Lighters up and Whoa) with Jasmin Lopez on the vocals. The clip segment is a colored one, where green is dominant and is rolling in slow motion. The scenes include a smoky alley-way and the entrance of Mr.T's Bowling Club. Nate Dogg and Warren G show up and join Snoop.

Trivia 
 The Western Conference is a real conference organized by Snoop and held on July 4, 2005. It was like peace talks between members of the former "West Coast" and an attempt to reunite them to put the westside into the mainstream by simultaneously launching a movement that helps newcomers and off-label street artists to reach the audience and get a contract. Snoop not only took up regenerative tasks but he's backing the whole movement by offering his Doggystyle label for the producing duties of the West Coast upcoming musical acts, if needed. Its main achievement was tha Dogg Pound team-up and that The Bay Area was represented too. It was estimated that about 60–70 rappers participated on the event including Ice Cube, WC, Mack 10, Jayo Felony, Mac Mall, Xzibit, Warren G, The Game, DJ Quik, Daz, Kurupt amongst others. It is unknown at the time if there will be another conferences called together in the future. (interviews:Snoop Dogg, The Game)
 Tiffany Foxx and her partner Brooke Holiday (with whom she forms the rap crew Hot Sadity) also participates in acting on the set, however she has been recognized later for his single "Shake that shit" with Snoop from his album Welcome to tha Chuuch - Da Album. (St. Louis American Mag)

Charts

Notes

External links 
 Video Static
 MVDB
 Mr. Cartoon official home page
 Snoop speaks about the single on MTV
 Snoop Dogg interview pt.1-2

2005 singles
Snoop Dogg songs
Song recordings produced by Warryn Campbell
Songs written by Snoop Dogg
Songs written by Maurice Gibb
Songs written by Robin Gibb
Songs written by Warryn Campbell
Songs written by Barry Gibb
Black-and-white music videos
2004 songs